Alluaudia ascendens is a species of Alluaudia endemic to Madagascar. It can reach 15 m in height. Its local name is  fantsiolotse.

Range and habitat
Alluaudia ascendens is native to Anosy region of southern Madagascar, where it is found in Taolagnaro, Andohahela, Ankodida, Behara-Tranomaro, and Ifotaky. The species' estimated extent of occurrence (EOO) is 2,417 km2, and its estimated area of occupancy (AOO) is 44 km2

it is native to the southeastern portion of the Madagascar spiny thickets ecoregion, where it inhabits dry spiny thicket and dry degraded thicket from sea level up to 499 meters elevation. Alluaudia ascendens is found in the open upper canopy of the thickets, in association with the baobab Adansonia za, Alluaudia procera, Operculicarya decaryi, Commiphora aprevalii, and Tetrapterocarpon geayi.

Ecology
Alluaudia ascendens is pollinated by bats. Verreaux's sifaka (Propithecus verrauxii), a native lemur, consumes its flowers.

References

Didiereaceae
Endemic flora of Madagascar
Flora of the Madagascar spiny thickets